Nation Radio UK is a quasi-national radio station in the UK, broadcasting online and on DAB. It is owned and operated by Nation Broadcasting.

The digital station was launched in June 2016 as Thames Radio with a line-up of former BBC and Capital presenters such as  breakfast host Neil Fox, Dean Martin, Tony Blackburn, Alex Lester, Pat Sharp and Neil Francis, with all presenters broadcasting from 'virtual studios' (as Thames Radio had no physical studio premises of its own).

In June 2017, Thames Radio dropped all of its presenters and became a non-stop music station, until changing its name to Nation Radio in June 2018. This was because the company behind Thames Radio had acquired a radio licence from Rock Radio Scotland (which was being unused) and wanted to launch a more 'national' service which would also include a station in Wales in time.

In 2021, DJs broadcasting on Nation Radio UK included Russ Williams and Neil Francis, with Mike Read broadcasting The Heritage Chart every Sunday at 5pm.

In May 2022, broadcaster Greg Burns joined Nation Radio UK. Burns presents the weekday drive programme and weekend breakfast. 

As of December 2022, the station broadcasts to a weekly audience of 127,000, according to RAJAR.

Presenters

Current presenters
 Tony Dibbin
 Neil Fox
 Russ Williams
 Greg Burns
 Mark Franklin
 Neil Greenslade
 Steve Penk

Past presenters
 Dave Brown
 Paul Newman
 Mike Read
 Adam English
 Neil Francis
 Dean Martin
 Pat Sharp

References

External links

Radio stations in London
Radio stations established in 2016
Radio stations established in 2018
Rock radio stations in the United Kingdom
Nation Broadcasting